Neil Jonathan Thurgood (born 18 February 1977) is a former English cricketer. Thurgood was a right-handed batsman who bowled right-arm fast-medium.

In 1999, Thurgood made his debut and his List-A debut for Dorset against  Scotland in the 2nd round of the 1999 NatWest Trophy. Thurgood represented the county in 5 List-A matches, with his final List-A match for the county coming against Yorkshire in the 2nd round of the 2004 Cheltenham & Gloucester Trophy.

In 1999, Thurgood made his debut for Dorset in the Minor Counties Championship against Herefordshire. From 1999 to 2006, he represented the county in 36 Minor Counties Championship matches, with his final match for the county coming against Devon in 2006.

External links
Neil Thurgood at Cricinfo
Neil Thurgood at CricketArchive

1977 births
Living people
Sportspeople from Bournemouth
Cricketers from Dorset
English cricketers
Dorset cricketers